On Thin Ice is a 1966 Soviet spy film directed by Damir Vyatich-Berezhnykh, based on Georgiy Bryantsev's 1961 book, which provided the first authoritative public description of counterintelligence group GUKR (SMERSH).

Plot
Two NKVD agents fight foreign spies in the Oryol Oblast before and during the Second World War.

Release

On Thin Ice was released in the Soviet Union on 26 September 1966.

It was the highest-grossing film in the Soviet Union for 1966, with 42.5 million tickets sold.

References

External links

 (part 1, in Russian, no subtitles)
 (part 2, in Russian, no subtitles)

Soviet historical drama films
Soviet spy films
Mosfilm films
World War II spy films
Eastern Front of World War II films
Films directed by Damir Vyatich-Berezhnykh
1960s historical drama films
Soviet World War II films
Russian World War II films